Charalampos Nakos (born 19 November 1988) is a Greek football midfielder currently a free agent.

He started his career from the Panetolikos F.C. youth squad. During the 2009–2010 season, he played for Elaiofyto, on loan from Panetolikos.

In July 2010, he was released on a free transfer. He played for Tilikratis F.C. in the 2010–2011 season. Subsequently, he spent 6 months playing for AE Messolongi. In January 2012 he returned to Tilikratis F.C. who were competing in Football League 2.

References 

1988 births
Living people
Greek footballers
Panetolikos F.C. players
Association football midfielders
Footballers from Agrinio